The women's 1500 metres event at the 2003 IAAF World Indoor Championships was held on March 15–16.

Medalists

Results

Heats
First 2 of each heat (Q) and next 3 fastest (q) qualified for the semifinals.

Final

References
Results

1500
1500 metres at the World Athletics Indoor Championships
2003 in women's athletics